Hammamet is a town and commune in Tébessa Province in north-eastern Algeria.

References

Communes of Tébessa Province
Tébessa Province